Edson dos Santos Reis, or simply Edson (born February 26, 1990), is a Brazilian striker. He currently plays for Comercial-SP on loan from Vitória.

References

External links

1990 births
Living people
Expatriate footballers in Japan
Brazilian footballers
Brazilian expatriate footballers
Hokkaido Consadole Sapporo players
Esporte Clube Vitória players
Botafogo Futebol Clube (SP) players
Clube de Regatas Brasil players
Fortaleza Esporte Clube players
Comercial Futebol Clube (Ribeirão Preto) players
Association football forwards
J1 League players